Stratford High School is a public high school located in Goose Creek, South Carolina. It serves grades 9–12 and is a part of the Berkeley County School District. The school was originally built in 1981, and opened in 1983 with approximately 1100 students. An addition was added in 1998 to increase the physical capacity to 1600 students. The high school now serves over 1800 students who are housed in 113 classrooms in the main building and 16 portable classrooms outside the main building.

Notable alumni
Harold Green – Class of 1986, football player
Justin Smoak – Class of 2005, baseball player
Matt Wieters – Class of 2004, baseball player

References

Public high schools in South Carolina
Schools in Berkeley County, South Carolina
Goose Creek, South Carolina
1983 establishments in South Carolina
Educational institutions established in 1983